Golden number may mean:
 Golden number (time), a number assigned to a calendar year denoting its place in a Metonic cycle
 Golden ratio, an irrational mathematical constant with special properties in arts and mathematics
 Fibonacci number, a sequence of numbers which converges on the golden ratio